Crumpler is an Australian bag company.

Crumpler  may also refer to:
Crumpler (surname)
Crumpler, North Carolina
Crumpler, West Virginia
Joint Expedition Against Franklin, also known as the Battle of Crumpler's Bluff